Rudrasimha I was a Western Kshatrapa ruler, who reigned from 178 to 197 CE. He was son of Rudradaman I, grandson of Jayadaman, and grand-grandson of Chashtana. During his reign, the Abhiras became increasingly important. Some of them were even serving as generals. Ashvini Agrawal thinks that the Abhira king Isvardatta was a general in the service of Rudrasimha I who deposed his master in 188 A.D and ascended the throne. Ashvini Agrawal further says that Rudrasimha I soon deposed him and regained the throne in 190 A.D.

Reign

Numismatics and Epigraphics
From the reigns of Jivadaman and Rudrasimha I, the date of minting of each coin, reckoned in the Saka era, is usually written on the obverse behind the king's head in Brahmi numerals, allowing for a quite precise datation of the rule of each king. This is a rather uncommon case in Indian numismatics. Some, such as the numismat R.C Senior considered that these dates might correspond to the much earlier Azes era instead.

Influence of Abhiras

During his reign, the Abhiras became increasingly important. Some of them were even serving as generals. Ashvini Agrawal thinks that the Abhira king Isvardatta was a general in the service of Rudrasimha I who deposed his master in 188 A.D and ascended the throne. Ashvini Agrawal further says that Rudrasimha I soon deposed him and regained the throne in 190 A.D.

Rudrasimha I is also known for an inscription in Sanskrit at Gunda, north Kathiawar, mentioning "the digging of a well for the welfare of society by Senapati Bapaka's son, Rudrabhuti Abhira", and dated to Saka era 103 (181 CE). The inscription also gives a detailed genealogy of the kings up to Rudrasimha:

The inscription refers Rudrasimha to as simply a ksatrapa, ignoring the existence of any mahaksatrapa. According to Sudhakar Chattopadhyaya, this indicates that the Abhira general was the de facto ruler of the state, though not assuming any higher title. The inscription states Abhira Rudrabhuti as the son of the general Bapaka. The Abhira dynasty was probably related Abhira Rudrabhuti.

Notes

References
 Rapson, "A Catalogue of Indian coins in the British Museum. Andhras etc..."

Western Satraps